The Dömös Chapter was a collegiate chapter, established around 1107, in the Kingdom of Hungary. It was dedicated to Saint Margaret of Antioch.

Establishment 

Duke Álmosthe younger brother of Coloman the Learned, King of Hungaryestablished the collegiate chapter at Dömös around 1107. According to historian György Györffy, the duke set up the chapter after he returned from his pilgrimage in the Holy Land, taking a relic of Saint Margaret of Antioch with him. Scholar László Koszta writes that Duke Álmos had established the chapter, dedicated to Saint Margaret, before he departed for the pilgrimage.

References

Sources

Collegiate Chapters in Hungary
Dömös